The 2014–15 Bahrain First Division League was the 58th edition of top level football in Bahrain. The title was won by Al-Muharraq for the 33rd time and first time since the 2010–11 Bahrain First Division League campaign. The campaign was one of the most exciting in Bahraini football history with five teams in contention until the final weeks.

Teams

Sitra and Al-Najma were relegated at the end of the previous campaign and replaced by Bahrain Club and East Riffa. Bahrain club bounced back after one season away from the top flight and East Riffa were back after two seasons at the second level.

Stadia and locations

Although most clubs do have a stadium, all games are actually played at the National Stadium, Khalifa Sports City Stadium and Al Ahli Stadium in. Games are normally played as back to back headers.

League table

References

Bahraini Premier League seasons
1
Bah